Huckleberry Mountain is a summit located in Adirondack Mountains of New York located in the Town of Hope north-northwest of the hamlet of Hope Falls.

References

Mountains of Hamilton County, New York
Mountains of New York (state)